Hemisphere Pictures was a film production and distribution company that specialised in movies from the Philippines. More information is available at Kane W. Lynn.

Filmography

 Terror Is a Man (1959)
 The Walls of Hell (1964)
 Moro Witch Doctor (1964)
 The Ravagers (1965)
 Brides of Blood (1968)
 The Mad Doctor of Blood Island (1969)
 Beast of Blood (1970)
 Savage Sisters (1974)
 Ganito Kami Noon, Paano Kayo Ngayon? (1976)
 Sinong kapiling? Sinong kasiping? (1977)
 Banta ng Kahapon (1977)
 Kamakalawa (1981)

References

External links
Hemisphere Pictures at IMDb

Film production companies of the Philippines